Reek Sunday or Garland Sunday is an annual day of pilgrimage in Ireland. On the last Sunday in July, thousands of pilgrims climb Ireland's holiest mountain, Croagh Patrick (764 metres) in County Mayo. It is held in honour of Saint Patrick who is said to have spent forty days fasting on the mountain in the 5th century. Masses are held at the summit, where there is a small chapel. Some climb the mountain barefoot, as an act of penance, and some carry out 'rounding rituals', which were formerly a key part of the pilgrimage. This involves praying while walking sunwise around features on the mountain: seven times around the cairn of Leacht Benáin (Benan's grave), fifteen times around the circular perimeter of the summit, seven times around Leaba Phádraig (Patrick's bed), and then seven times around three ancient burial cairns known as Reilig Mhuire (Mary's cemetery). Until 1970, it was traditional for pilgrims to climb the mountain after sunset.

The pilgrimage has been held yearly for at least 1,500 years. It is likely that it pre-dates Christianity and was originally a ritual associated with the festival of Lughnasadh. Pilgrimages were made to the tops of many other mountains at this time of year, such as Mount Brandon and Slievecallan in Munster, Slieve Donard in Ulster and Church Mountain in Leinster. The earliest surviving mention of a pilgrimage at Croagh Patrick is from the year 1113, when the Annals of Ulster record that "a ball of fire came on the night of the feast of Patrick on Cruacháin Aighle [Croagh Patrick] and destroyed thirty of those fasting". Historically, pilgrimages were made to the mountaintop on Saint Patrick's Day, the Feast of the Assumption, and the last Friday in July (Crom Dubh's Friday).

Today, most pilgrims climb Croagh Patrick from the direction of Murrisk Abbey to the north. Originally, most pilgrims climbed the mountain from the east, following the Togher Patrick (Tochár Phádraig) pilgrim path from Ballintubber Abbey. This route is dotted with prehistoric monuments. The Tochár Phádraig may have originally been the main route to the mountain from Cruachan, seat of the Kings of Connacht. The Tochar Phadraig was revived and reopened by Pilgrim Paths of Ireland.

Between 15,000 and 30,000 pilgrims participate, compared to a yearly climbing total of more than 100,000. The Archbishop of Tuam leads the climb each year. Up to 300 personnel from eleven mountain rescue teams from across Ireland are involved, including the local Mayo Mountain Rescue Team, for whom it is the busiest day of the year. Also involved is the Air Corps, Irish Cave Rescue Organisation (ICRO) the Order of Malta, Civil Defence Ireland and members of the Garda Síochána. Injuries ranging from cuts and broken bones to hypothermia and cardiac arrest occur each year. The climb takes two hours, on average, and one and a half hours to descend.

Annual climbs

1999
In 1999, 25,000 pilgrims took part in the climb in ideal conditions. Archbishop Michael Neary of Tuam spoke on the mountain of the improving quality of life which Ireland was experiencing in the late 1990s.

2002
Michael Neary spoke of the fear created by banking and commerce as well as by the Church and state at a meeting with pilgrims in Westport prior to the 2002 climb. Pilgrims came from Australia, Europe, the United Kingdom, and the United States. Rain created difficult climbing conditions on the day.

2006
Around 20,000 people took part in 2006 during particularly bad weather of wind and rain. Archbishops Seán Brady and Michael Neary said Mass on top, with Neary appealing for kindness and goodwill to be shown to immigrant families. Twenty-three people were airlifted or stretchered off the mountain with illnesses and injuries; two of these were hospitalised. The first analytic survey was conducted when 11,000 pilgrims were interviewed. Two-thirds of them were men, one third were women, five percent came from outside Ireland, and two percent climbed in their bare feet.

2007
Over 30,000 pilgrims climbed Croagh Patrick on Reek Sunday in 2007. There were some minor foot injuries, whilst one man had a suspected cardiac arrest on the mountain.

2008
Over 25,000 pilgrims took part in 2008. The Mass on the summit, celebrated by Michael Neary, was broadcast live worldwide for the first time ever by RTÉ. He spoke of consumer values that he felt were seducing society. Over 20 priests were involved in the event. Injuries were very few.

2009
Only 18,000 pilgrims climbed the mountain in 2009. Weather conditions were particularly bad with many choosing to climb the mountain the previous day. Between five and six children contracted hypothermia. Some participants sustained minor cuts, others complained of coronary problems, whilst one woman was airlifted off the mountain after breaking her ankle the day before, and a man was airlifted to hospital after having a suspected cardiac arrest on the mountain. Prior to the climb, Mayo Mountain Rescue Team advised pilgrims to carry some sort of footwear but not flip-flops, sandals, stiletto heels or wellingtons; it was the first time they had ever issued such advice. Pilgrims were also told to use a stick for walking, wear multiple layers of clothing and to scale the mountain at a slow pace. Archbishop Michael Neary said before the 2009 climb that people were "searching desperately" for hope in the "menacing desert" of the recession. In his homily on the mountain, Neary talked of the effects the recession had on family life.

2010
Michael Neary led the 2010 National Pilgrimage to Croagh Patrick involving about 20,000 people. The Mayo Mountain Rescue Team, which responds to about 50 emergency calls to the mountain annually, called for safety maintenance work to be carried out in an area where the increased number of climbers, all year round, has caused significant erosion.

2013
The climb on 28 July 2013 took place in sunny weather and was undertaken by between 15,000 and 20,000 people. Ash and blackthorn sticks were for sale at €3 each, or for rent at €1.50. Drought conditions during July made it unusually dry underfoot on the day of the climb. Nearly 300 volunteers with Mayo Mountain Rescue, the Irish Cave Rescue Organisation, the Order of Malta Ambulance Corps, Civil Defence Ireland, and an Air Corps helicopter were in attendance and on standby. There were 17 reported injuries, including two which required airlifts. A woman who suffered a head injury on the peak was treated by Mayo Mountain Rescue and a 67-year-old tourist who suffered suspected cardiac problems Mid-descent was treated by Order of Malta Ambulance Rescue and First aid teams, before being winched into a helicopter by Irish Air Corps and transported to hospital. The weather for the day was very good, with winds being very mild in comparison to other years.

2015
The climb on 26 July 2015 was cancelled. Met Éireann issued a yellow weather alert for the day until 3pm forecasting heavy rain. Hundreds ignored that warning and traversed up the peak regardless. Locally it was estimated to be as many as 10,000 attempted.

Many are believed to have been forced to turn back and Mayo Mountain Rescue Team confirmed to TheJournal.ie that ten people have been treated for hypothermia.

2016
Twenty to twenty five thousand people participated in the 2016 Reek Sunday pilgrimage, which was led by the Archbishop of Tuam, Dr Michael Neary, with the Papal Nuncio, Archbishop Charles John Brown. Volunteers from all twelve Irish mountain rescue teams, including 120 members of the Order of Malta, were present as part of a safety plan coordinated by members of the Mayo Mountain Rescue team. A detachment from the Air Corps was on duty with a helicopter to rescue any casualties from the mountain.

2017 
At least 25,000 people took part in the 2017 Reek Sunday pilgrimage. One of the first to climb the mountain was the Archbishop of Tuam, Dr Michael Neary, accompanied by Bishop Fintan Monahan, Bishop of Killaloe, and Gearóid Dullea, executive secretary of the Irish Catholic Bishops Conference, beginning the at 7 am. Archbishop Neary celebrated Mass in the mountaintop oratory at 11 am. Thirteen people were injured, three of whom were airlifted off the mountain.

2018 
An estimated 5,000 people took part in the 2018 Reek Sunday. Archbishop of Tuam Michael Neary led the pilgrimage up the mountain. Hourly masses were also celebrated at the summit. Mayo Mountain Rescue Team organised and co-ordinated rescue and emergency care services. Good weather conditions kept casualties to a minimum, although one 46-year-old man had to be airlifted to hospital in Galway with chest pains.

2019 
Thousands of people have taken part in the 2019 pilgrimage on Croagh Patrick. Rescue teams assisting just over 20 people for mostly minor injuries. Misty weather at the summit early in the day gave way to clear conditions as the afternoon progressed. The Archbishop of Tuam, Dr Michael Neary celebrated mass on the summit in the morning. Afterwards he spoke of the appeal of the climb for generations of people. Dr Neary said there was something of a parable in the manner in which people approached the day, assisting others and ensuring that those in difficulty were given support on their journey. A range of agencies spent the day on standby to assist with the treatment of those with injuries. The Irish Air Corps airlifted a small number of people from the mountain, while Order of Malta, Mountain Rescue and Civil Defence teams patrolled the route to cater for all incidents that arose.

References

Annual events in Ireland
July observances
Christian pilgrimages
Roman Catholic pilgrimage sites in Ireland
Christian Sunday observances
Holidays and observances by scheduling (nth weekday of the month)
Summer events in the Republic of Ireland